The Kangean Islands or simply Kangean (Indonesian: Kepulauan Kangean) is a collective name referred to the area of Kangean (the main island) and its surrounding islands lie in the north of Bali in northern Bali Sea, northwest of the Lesser Sunda Islands (Nusa Tenggara), administratively part of Sumenep Regency, East Java Province. Apart from the regencial administrative, the capital of Kangean is Arjasa, it is the biggest district which located in the western hemisphere of the island. The Kangean Islands has a relatively large potential of natural resources, such as natural gas, teak, coconut, and salt production.

Layout
The largest island, at about 490 km², is Kangean Island. Other islands include Paliat, Sepanjang, and several smaller islands. The towns of Arjasa and Kalikatak, both on Kangean Island, are the area's largest population centres.
The Kangean islands have strong historic and ethnic ties with Madura, Bali, West Nusa Tenggara, Sumbawa, South Borneo, and also South Sulawesi.
The majority religion at Kangean is Islam.

The highest elevation point on the islands is in the northeast at 1,192 feet (364 m.), while overall the islands are low in elevation. The weather tends to rain regularly.

Saltwater crocodiles are reported to be present within the island's coastal mangroves.

They are administered as three districts (kecamatan) of Sumenep Regency -  Arjasa, Kangayan, and Sapêken. Arjasa District forms the west part of the main island, Kangayan District forms the east part of that island, and Sapêken District comprises a number of separate islands to the east and southeast of Kangean, of which Paliat and Sepanjang are the largest. Together, their population was 108,264 in the 2000 census, increasing to 123,367 in the 2010 count and to 161,056 at the 2020 Census.

Ethnic group 
The Kangeanese (Kangeanese: Oréng Kangéan, Indonesian: Orang Kangean or Suku Kangean) are an Austronesian ethnic group native to the Indonesian island of Kangean and its surrounding islands. The Kangeanese population live mostly on the Kangean Islands, making up 90% of the island group's population of 161,056.

Languages
The Kangean language is mainly spoken in Kangean areas.

Exports and reserves
Since 1993 the islands have been the site of substantial natural gas mining. The natural gas fields were first discovered and developed by the United States corporation ARCO, which became a subsidiary of BP in 2000. In mid-2004, BP sold its Kangean holdings to an Indonesian corporation, PT Energi Mega Persada. The islands are connected to East Java via a 430 km pipeline, most of which runs underwater.

Other economic activities on the islands include teak, coconut, and salt production.

Airstrip
In 2014, the local government agreed to reactivate an old airstrip on Kangean Island. The airstrip is 1,000 meters long and 30 meters wide.

References

External links
 Map including the Kangean Islands

Archipelagoes of Indonesia
Islands of the Java Sea
Populated places in Indonesia